Sociedad Deportiva Eibar Urko is a Spanish football team based in Eibar, Gipuzkoa, in the autonomous community of the Basque Country. Founded in 2014, it is the second reserve team of SD Eibar, and plays in the División de Honor – Group 2, holding home matches in the Unbe Sports Complex.

History
Founded in 2014 as Urkomendi 14 Futbol Kirol (named after a local mountain), the club was created to accommodate young players who were released from SD Eibar. In June 2016, the club  – then playing in the sixth-level Preferente de Guipúzcoa – joined the structure of Eibar, and became their second reserve team, behind CD Vitoria; they also changed name to SD Eibar Urko. 

Eibar Urko achieved a first-ever promotion to the fifth division in 2018, 
and seemed set to advance further to the regional fourth tier (Tercera División) as 2019 champions of Gipuzkoa; however, Vitoria's relegation from the third level at the same time blocked Urko's promotion due to rules preventing teams owned by the same club competing in the same division. This also meant Urko could not be promoted at the end of the 2019–20 season either unless Vitoria achieved the same goal, but they were eliminated from the 2020 Tercera División play-offs. The outcome in 2020–21 was similar: Urko were permitted to take part in their promotion playoffs, although there was no possibility of going up as Vitoria did not qualify from theirs.

Season to season

References

External links
Official website 
Fútbol Regional profile 

SD Eibar
Association football clubs established in 2014
Football clubs in the Basque Country (autonomous community)
2014 establishments in Spain
Spanish reserve football teams